Cadlina excavata is a species of sea slug or dorid nudibranch, a marine gastropod mollusk in the family Cadlinidae.

Distribution 
This species was described from the Mediterranean Sea.

References

Cadlinidae
Gastropods described in 1951